Tonna dunkeri is a species of large sea snail, a marine gastropod mollusk in the family Tonnidae, the tun shells.

Description
The length of the shell attains 47 mm.

Distribution
This marine species occurs off South Africa and Madagascar.

References

 Hanley, S. (1860a), Descriptions of New Univalve Shells from the Collections of H. Cuming and Sylvanus Hanley. Proceedings of the Zoological Society of London, 1859 27: 429-431
 Bayer, Ch. (1937) Catalogue of the Doliidae in the Rijksmuseum van Natuurlijke Historie. Overgedrukt uit Zoologiscshe Mededelingen XX, Leiden, E. J. Brill, page(s): 38 
 Kilias, R. (1962) Das Tierreich, Lieferung 77, Gastropoda / Prosobranchia: 1-63, Walter de Gruyter & Co., Berlin. page(s): 35
 Kilburn R.N. (1971). On some species of the families Tonnidae, Hipponicidae, Buccinidae, Columbariidae, Fasciolariidae, Psammobiidae and Mactridae (Mollusca) in South African waters. Annals of the Natal Museum 20(3):483-497
 Steyn, D.G. & Lussi, M. (1998) Marine Shells of South Africa. An Illustrated Collector’s Guide to Beached Shells. Ekogilde Publishers, Hartebeespoort, South Africa, ii + 264 pp. page(s): 70
 Vos, C. (1999) A new Tonna Brünnich, 1772 (Gastropoda: Tonnidae) from Gulf of Aden. Gloria Maris, Vol. 38, (1-6), p. 43-47, pl. 8-9 page(s): 44
 Vos, C. (2007) A conchological Iconography (No. 13) - The family Tonnidae. 123 pp., 30 numb. plus 41 (1 col.) un-numb. text-figs, 33 maps., 63 col. pls, Conchbooks, Germany page(s): 93

External links
 Barnard, K. H. (1963). Contributions to the knowledge of South African marine Mollusca. Part III. Gastropoda: Prosobranchiata: Taenioglossa. i>Annals of the South African Museum 47(1): 1-199.
 Herbert, D.G., Jones, G.J. & Atkinson, L.J. (2018). Phylum Mollusca. In: Atkinson, L.J. and Sink, K.J. (eds) Field Guide to the Offshore Marine Invertebrates of South Africa. Malachite Marketing and Media: Pretoria. Pp. 249–320

Tonnidae
Gastropods described in 1860
Taxa named by Sylvanus Charles Thorp Hanley